The Lebanese Women's Football League is the only league of women's football in Lebanon. It is run by the Lebanese Football Association and began in May 2008, with six teams participating in the debut season. As of the 2021–22 season, eight teams participate in the league.

Clubs

Champions

Wins by club

2021–22 season 
The following eight clubs are competing in the 2021–22 season.

Former clubs 
The following clubs are not competing in the Lebanese Women's Football League during the 2021–22 season, but have previously competed in the league for at least one season.

Top scorers

Media coverage 
In October 2022, the LFA and FIFA signed an agreement to broadcast all matches in the Lebanese Women's Football League, Lebanese Second Division and Lebanese Super Cup through the FIFA+ platform, and some Lebanese Premier League games.

See also
 Lebanon women's national football team
 Lebanese Premier League
 Lebanese football league system

References 

 
women
Lebanon
1
Sports leagues established in 2008
2008 establishments in Lebanon